A sumpter is an older term for a pack animal. Sumpter also subsequently became a surname and place name.

It may refer to:

Places

United states
 Sumpter, Arkansas
 Sumpter, Oregon
 Sumpter, Texas, a ghost town
 Sumpter, Wisconsin, a town
 Sumpter Township, Cumberland County, Illinois
 Sumpter Township, Wayne County, Michigan

People
 Barry Sumpter (born 1965), former American professional basketball player
 Donald Sumpter (born 1943), British actor
 Jeremy Sumpter (born 1989), American actor
 John Sumpter, scientist
 Justin Sumpter (born 1996), American football player
 Michael Sumpter (1947–2001), American serial killer
 Rachell Sumpter (born 1972), painter
 Tika Sumpter (born 1980), American actor

See also
 Sumter (disambiguation)
 Fort Sumter